Pulomas Station is a light rail station of the Jakarta LRT Line A, located at Kayu Putih, Pulo Gadung, East Jakarta. The station is one of the six stations of the first phase of Jakarta LRT Line A which opened on 1 December 2019.

Services

References

East Jakarta
Jakarta LRT stations
Railway stations opened in 2019